In ancient Rome, a wedding was a sacred ritual involving many religious practices. In order for the wedding to take place the bride and the groom or their fathers needed to consent to the wedding. Generally, the wedding would take place in June due to the god Juno. Weddings would never take place on days that were considered unlucky. During the wedding the groom would pretend to kidnap the bride. This was done to convince the household guardians, or lares, that the bride did not go willingly. Afterwards, the bride and the groom had their first sexual experiences on a couch called a lectus. In a Roman wedding both sexes had to wear specific clothing. Boys had to wear the toga virillis while the bride to wear a wreath, a veil, a yellow hairnet, chaplets of roses, seni crines, and the hasta caelibaris. All of the guests would wear the same clothes as the groom and the bride. The Romans believed that if bad omens showed up during a wedding it would indicate the couple was evil or unlucky. In order for a marriage to be successful there needed to be no evil omens and everyone must follow the traditional customs.

Clothing 

Before the wedding, either boy put away his bulla and toga praetexta, and put on his toga virillis. Boys usually started wearing togae virillis around puberty, or when the boy's parents believed he was sexually mature. The bulla was dedicated to Lares. The girl removed her toga, and put away her childhood toys. After the wedding, each of them donned a royal white robe called tunica recta. The bride wove the tunica recta herself—a symbolic act, as once she was married, she would be expected to weave her family's clothes. She also wore an infula on the wedding day.

The bride's hair was covered in the seni crines, a wreath and a veil called the flammeum. She also wore a yellow hairnet dedicated to the lares; yellow was significant in Roman weddings because it was the color of the flammeum. The bride's hair was dressed by the hasta caelibaris ("celibate spear"), who had symbolic power to the Romans. The usage of the hasta displayed the husband's authority over his bride and protected against a troubled marriage. The bridal couple also wore chaplets of roses.

The bride's clothes were similar to a priestess' clothing. All of the marriage's guests wore the same clothes as the groom and the bride, to prevent evil spirits from identifying the wedding couple. As the wedding was a sacred affair, an improperly dressed bride would be an attack on Roman morality and chaste Roman women. To prove to the gods that the wedding was in good faith, many people had to view the bride in her garb.

Organization 

In the sponsalia, the maiden was promised to the groom by her father or her tutor. The promise could be made directly to the groom, but was usually made to the groom's father.

To promise his daughter to the groom, the bride's father told the groom's father:  (or ),  (or )  However, the bride's father could cancel the wedding at any time.

For a wedding to take place, the bride and groom, or the father in each family, needed to consent. Augustus decreed that if the bride's father did not agree to the marriage, he must provide a reason. Marriage between children was also outlawed. The youngest marriageable ages were fourteen for men and twelve for women. The Romans never practiced polygamy, so both parties had to be unmarried; and the bride and groom could not be related.

The groom chose the wedding date; however, he could not chose any day of the year, as many were considered unlucky. June was the preferred month, as it was the month of Juno, the god of childbirth and marriage. Before the wedding, the bride's family sought the protection of the gods by performing small sacrifices and giving coins to Lares.

The wedding took place at the house of the bride's father. There was a large feast, at which the attendees were served a special cake, a mustaceum, made with grape juice. Augustus limited the cost of these feasts to one thousand sesterces.

By evening, the groom pretended to take the bride by force from her mother's arms, so the household gods would not think the bride was willingly leaving them. The Romans believed the only bride of value was a virgin who had to be stolen from her family. Because of this, the Romans simulated the bride being abducted from her family. The tradition dictated that the bride cry out in pain as she was herded along the route to her new house. As the bride was taken to her new home, guests sang the Hymenaeus and carried a whitehorn torch, a spina alba, to honor Ceres.  When the procession reached the groom's house, the groom entered first; the bride then entered after smearing the doorway with sheep's wool covered in oil and fat, as bride would have no gods protecting her until she arrived at the groom's house. The bride was officially taken in to her husband's family by fire and water, an act symbolic of life. To visualize the consummation of marriage, the groom broke a loaf of bread over the bride's head. Sheaves of wheat could also be thrown at the bride.

Once at the groom's house, the married couple relaxed on a richly ornamented couch or bed called a lectus or genialis, and had their first sexual experiences together. As soon as the couple entered either the bedroom or the groom's house they were considered married.

Customs

Religious 

The gods of the Roman wedding were Juno, Venus, Hymen, and occasionally Terra.  The bride was the focus of the wedding, and because of this her face was painted red. It was believed that if the betrothed couple were unlucky or evil, omens would appear at the wedding. However, if no omens appeared, that too could indicate that they were unlucky or evil. In Rome, it was believed a happy marriage was possible only if you followed all of the customs and had no evil omens.

Non-religious 
In Rome, the ideal bride was both frightened and joyful about the marriage. She was expected to learn to submit to her husband. Ideally, she would have had no prior sexual experience, as the purpose of the Roman wedding was to ensure that the bride would reproduce in the confines of a legal marriage. The ideal groom was supposed to be sexually experienced, and eager for the wedding to take place. Since the bride's purpose was to legitimately reproduce, mocking the bride was equivalent to attacking the Roman family structure. For the same reason, the bride had to follow all traditions perfectly; if she didn't, the children of the marriage would be illegitimate. The validity or connubium of a Roman wedding was partially determined by the bride's suffering, so Romans expected to see the bride make a public display of her fear of the wedding. Until the Servian constitution, many weddings were illegitimate. The Servian constitution made all Romans citizens, and therefore, all of their marriages were now legal. 

Many patricians opposed the intermarriage of their members with the plebeians, and in 450 BC a law was passed prohibiting such marriages; however, it was repealed by the lex Canuleia in 445 BC.  Some patricians did not believe plebeian marriages were legitimate, as many religious practices were exclusive to the patricians. The Patricians believed that plebeian marriages were equivalent to sexual promiscuity.

Dowry 
In ancient Rome, the bride's family was expected to provide a dowry. All of the bride's property became her husband's property, or that of her husband's father. Occasionally the bride retained some of her possessions.

Depictions in art and literature 
In the ancient city of Pompeii some of the frescoes in the "Villa of the Mysteries" may depict Roman weddings. However, it possible that they depict a woman being introduced into the Cult of Dionysus, a beauty pageant honoring Dionysus, or some combination of these. Depictions of weddings in ancient Rome generally allude to the Roman gods. In Roman literature, a bride is usually portrayed as a grieving woman who needs to be persuaded or forced to marry.

References

Weddings by culture
Marriage in ancient Rome